Strayer is a surname. Notable people with the surname include:

 Barry Strayer (born 1932), Canadian judge
 Frank R. Strayer (1891–1964), actor, film writer, director, and producer
 Janet Strayer, German curler
 Joseph Strayer (1904–1987), American medievalist historian

See also
Strayer University